Polo Cup may refer to:

Water polo

Montenegrin Water Polo Cup, national water polo cup played in Montenegro
Greek Water Polo Cup
Croatian Water Polo Cup
Asian Water Polo Cup
Serbian Water Polo Cup
FINA Water Polo World Cup of the Fédération Internationale de Natation

Horseback polo

International Polo Cup, also called the Newport Cup and the Westchester Cup, it is a trophy in polo that was created in 1876
America's Polo Cup, polo event held annually in America from 2007 to 2010

Motorsport

ADAC Volkswagen Polo Cup